Charles Barham may refer to:

Charles Barham (priest) (died 1935), Archdeacon of Bombay
Charles C. Barham (1934–2010), American attorney
Charles Emmett "Cap" Barham (1904–1972), Democratic lieutenant governor of Louisiana 
Charles Foster Barham (1804–1884), English physician
Charles Middleton, 1st Baron Barham (1726–1813), British naval officer and politician